Enrique Tovar (born 2 April 1935) is a Venezuelan boxer. He competed in the men's welterweight event at the 1956 Summer Olympics.

References

1935 births
Living people
Venezuelan male boxers
Olympic boxers of Venezuela
Boxers at the 1956 Summer Olympics
Place of birth missing (living people)
Welterweight boxers